Samah Ramadan Mohamed (also Samah Ramadan, ; born April 16, 1978 in Cairo) is an Egyptian judoka, who played for the women's heavyweight category. She is a two-time Olympian, and a five-time medalist at the African Judo Championships. She also defeated Nigeria's Adijat Ayuba for the gold medal in the 78 kg class at the 2007 All-Africa Games in Algiers, Algeria.

Ramadan made her official debut for the 2004 Summer Olympics in Athens, where she lost the first preliminary round match of the women's heavyweight class (+78 kg), by an ippon and a soto makikomi (outer wraparound), to Russia's Tea Donguzashvili. Ramadan later qualified for the repechage rounds, but she was beaten in her first match by South Korea's Choi Sook-Ie.

At the 2008 Summer Olympics in Beijing, Ramadan competed for the second time in the women's +78 kg class. She received a bye for the second preliminary round, before losing out again this time to Cuba's Idalys Ortiz by an ippon and a seoi nage (shoulder throw). Because her opponent advanced further into the semi-finals, Ramadan offered another for the bronze medal by defeating Australia's Janelle Shepherd in the repechage rounds. She finished only in seventh place, after losing out the final repechage bout to another South Korean judoka Kim Na-Young, who successfully scored a waza-ari-awasete-ippon (two full points), and a kesa-gatame (scarf hold), at three minutes and thirty seconds.

References

External links

NBC Olympics Profile

Egyptian female judoka
Living people
Olympic judoka of Egypt
Judoka at the 2004 Summer Olympics
Judoka at the 2008 Summer Olympics
1978 births
Sportspeople from Cairo
African Games gold medalists for Egypt
African Games medalists in judo
Competitors at the 2007 All-Africa Games
20th-century Egyptian women
21st-century Egyptian women